Assoungha is one of three departments in Ouaddaï, a region of Chad. Its capital is Adré.

Sub-prefectures 
Assoungha  is divided into four sub-prefectures:

 Adré
 Hadjer Hadid
 Mabrone
 Borota
 Molou
 Tourane

See also 

 Regions of Chad

References

Departments of Chad
Ouaddaï Region